The Dark Pictures Anthology: Little Hope is a 2020 interactive drama and survival horror video game with psychological and folk horror elements developed by Supermassive Games and published by Bandai Namco Entertainment. The second installment in The Dark Pictures Anthology, Little Hope serves as the sequel to the anthology's season premiere, Man of Medan. Will Poulter stars as the game's leading actor and plays the role of one of the protagonists, named Andrew. Set in the fictional eponymous town, located in Massachusetts, the game follows four college students chaperoned by their professor. After their bus crashes by the area, the group finds themselves trapped within Little Hope by an impenetrable fog. As they explore the deserted town, the characters are pursued by demons whose appearances are reminiscent of the ways in which the townspeople of Little Hope's colonial era died.

Little Hope contains many decision-making scenes that dictate how the plot will progress and how the characters will develop over time. With these choices, which players make on behalf of the characters, any of the ensemble cast's five playable protagonists can die permanently or survive the night. Quick time events determine whether a protagonist will live through the very end. To guide players in navigating the story, the game features a set of collectable items called "pictures" that give premonitions of what may happen later in the plot. The developer, Supermassive Games, decided to tackle the topic of witch trials for Little Hope's story and explore the reasons why mass paranoia around witchcraft happened in the first place.

The game was released for PlayStation 4, Windows, and Xbox One on 30 October 2020 to mixed reviews. On 27 September 2022, the game was released on PlayStation 5 and Xbox Series X/S. Another installment in the series, House of Ashes, was released in October 2021 and stars Ashley Tisdale.

Gameplay 

The Dark Pictures Anthology: Little Hope is a survival horror video game played from a third-person perspective in which the player assumes control of five characters who are trapped in a ghost town of Little Hope. The player needs to choose different dialogue options, which will influence the course of the narrative and the relationships between the protagonists. The game can be played multiple times, as there are multiple endings and multiple scenarios based on the decisions that the players make. Depending on the choices of the players, some or all characters may or may not die by the end of the story. Action sequences mainly feature quick time events, most of which, if missed, can lead to dire consequences for each character.

Similar to Man of Medan, the game features two multiplayer modes. "Shared Story" allows 2 players to play co-op online and "Movie Night" allows up to 5 players to select their own characters and prompts them to pass the controller at each turn.

Plot 

Little Hope is presented as an unfinished story in the possession of the omnipresent Curator (Pip Torrens/Tony Pankhurst), who requests the player's assistance in completing it.

In the present day, a bus driver is taking four students, Andrew (Will Poulter), Angela (Ellen David/Rachel Dobell), Taylor (Caitlyn Sponheimer/Eleni Miariti), and Daniel (Kyle Bailey/Jonathan Burteaux), and their professor, John (Alex Ivanovici/Sukesh Khosla), on a class trip, before crashing after being forced to take a detour through the ghost town of Little Hope. The story then jumps back to a prologue set in 1972 regarding the Clark family: the parents, Anne (David/Dobell) and James (Ivanovici/Khosla), and their four adopted children, Anthony (Poulter), Tanya (Sponheimer/Miariti), Dennis (Bailey/Burteaux), and Megan (Ella Rose Coderre). Megan places her doll onto a stove lit by Anthony, starting a house fire where each of the family members die except for Anthony, who runs back into the burning house as the prologue ends.

Back in the present, the group set off into Little Hope to search for help as the bus driver goes missing. They enter a bar to use a phone and encounter Vince (Kevin Hanchard/Winston Thomas), Tanya's boyfriend at the time of the house fire, who reveals that there is no power. On the way up the road, Andrew and Angela find a doll and are dragged backwards in time by a ghostly figure named Mary (Holly Smith). The group all begin to collide with Mary and see flashbacks where Reverend Carver (David Smith/Leonardo Patane) is blackmailing Mary into helping him frame residents of Little Hope (doppelgängers of the present-day group) for witchcraft. Each member of the group except for Andrew witnesses their doppelgänger be executed before being attacked by a demonic version of them and either successfully fleeing or dying based on player choice. Ultimately, the group ends up at the Clark family household and witness one final flashback where Carver has betrayed Mary and has her framed for witchcraft. Andrew can instruct his doppelgänger to either blame Carver and have him taken away, have Mary's doll burned, or blame Mary and have her executed.

Returning to the present, Andrew is revealed to have actually been the bus driver, Anthony, who hallucinated the present-day group and the residents from the flashbacks as figures from his past, including his family, after being forced to return to Little Hope. Depending on his treatment towards Vince, who he ultimately blamed, and whether he has a gun, Anthony will either be arrested, commit suicide, continue to blame himself for his family's deaths, or accept that the house fire was not his fault.

Development 

Little Hope is the second game in a series of eight planned for The Dark Pictures Anthology. The game was first revealed as a post-credits teaser trailer at the end of Man of Medan. Unlike Man of Medan, which was a modern-day story, Little Hopes story covers multiple timelines, with the narrative jumping back and forth between the present and the past. The game features more supernatural elements when compared to its predecessor and the team chose witchcraft as the game's main theme as they wanted to explore its root causes. Pete Samuels, the game's director, added that the team was intrigued by the "greed, paranoia, and fear of God" which motivated people to commit heinous acts during that period. The team took inspirations from both the Silent Hill series and The Crucible, which is a play about the Salem witch trials that took place in the Massachusetts Bay Colony during 1692–93. The game was also inspired by films including The Witch, The Blair Witch Project, Hellraiser, It Follows,  The Omen, and Season of the Witch. Will Poulter was hired to voice and provide motion capture for Andrew, the game's lead character.

Like its predecessor, the game was designed to be replayable. The team refined the gameplay, after hearing feedback from players who complained about Man of Medans gameplay. For instance, the player character can walk faster. In addition, the team lowered the difficulty of the game's quick-time events, giving more time for the players to react. It had also removed the tank controls.

The Dark Pictures Anthology was envisioned by Supermassive Games as a series of unrelated games which explores different themes and horror genres. The studio's plan was to release each instalment every six months, though this target was missed. The game was first revealed when Man of Medan launched in August 2019. The teaser trailer was included as a post-credit scene for the game. Publisher Bandai Namco Entertainment announced the game on 14 April 2020. The game was released for PlayStation 4, Windows, and Xbox One on 30 October 2020. PlayStation 5 and Xbox Series X/S versions were later released on 27 September 2022, alongside a patch for all versions that included new quality-of-life features and accessibility options.

Reception 

The Dark Pictures Anthology: Little Hope received "mixed or average" reviews.

Jordan Devore of Destructoid stated that there was "more breathing room during exploration [...] with cues to stop you from accidentally 'moving forward' to the next area before you've finished combing the area for hidden tidbit-filled collectibles." Regarding the quick-time event notifications that alerted a player about an upcoming QTE, some critics opined that this feature took away some of the game's difficulty because "it's now much harder to fail". Kyle LeClair from Hardcore Gamer called the plot twist "polarizing". Hardcore Gamer also criticized the game for not building up from the innovations introduced in Man of Medan, writing, "Little Hope doesn't exactly succeed on the innovation front. You can feel free to basically just copy/paste everything I said about Man of Medan [...] it was foolish to expect any particularly grand advancements, since all of the games in this series would preferably want a consistent feel, but it would have been nice to have even a little more variety." A negative review from IGN's Lucy O'Brien described Little Hope as "an odd, anemic thriller" where "its choice and consequence system feels strangely superficial".

Upon release, the digital download version of Little Hope was the 4th most downloaded game in its debut week, and ranked 9th in terms of physical sales.

Sequel 

The third installment in the series, The Dark Pictures Anthology: House of Ashes, was released 22 October 2021 for PlayStation 4, PlayStation 5, Windows, Xbox One, and Xbox Series X/S, and features actress Ashley Tisdale.

References

Notes

External links 
 

2020 video games
Bandai Namco games
Survival video games
2020s horror video games
Interactive movie video games
Multiplayer and single-player video games
PlayStation 4 games
PlayStation 4 Pro enhanced games
PlayStation 5 games
Supermassive Games
Unreal Engine games
Video game sequels
Video games developed in the United Kingdom
Video games featuring female protagonists
Video games postponed due to the COVID-19 pandemic
Video games with alternate endings
Video games set in Massachusetts
Windows games
Xbox One games
Xbox One X enhanced games
Xbox Series X and Series S games